White Pine Press is an American, nonprofit, literary press located in Buffalo, New York, publishing poetry, fiction, essays, and world literature in translation. The press was founded by poet, translator, editor and publisher Dennis Maloney in 1973.

Notable authors published by White Pine Press include James Wright, Jacqueline Johnson, Robert Bly, William Matthews, Sonia Sanchez, Christopher Merrill David St. John, Marjorie Agosín, Matsuo Bashō, Pablo Neruda, and Peter Johnson.

White Pine Press titles have been reviewed in venues including The New York Times, Publishers Weekly, Library Journal,  Booklist, and many others.

The press has received funding from the National Endowment for the Arts, the New York State Council on the Arts, private foundations including the Lila-Wallace Foundation, and individuals. White Pine Press titles are distributed by Consortium Book Sales & Distribution. Awards given by the press include the White Pine Press Poetry Prize.

References

External links
 White Pine Press Website
 Interview: Three Percent > 4 May 1010 Interview with Dennis Maloney of White Pine Press by Chad W. Post
 Interview: The Alchemist’s Kitchen > May 1, 2010 > Interviewing the Publisher Behind White Pine Press by Susan Rich
 Consortium Book Sales & Distribution > White Pine Press Publisher Page
 Council of Literary Magazines and Small Presses > Directory of Member Publishers

Companies based in Buffalo, New York
Publishing companies established in 1973
Book publishing companies based in New York (state)
Non-profit organizations based in New York (state)
New York (state) culture
Literary publishing companies
Non-profit publishers